The Giske Wildlife Sanctuary is located in the Makkevika inlet on Giiske island in the municipality of Giske in Møre og Romsdal county, Norway.

The area received protection in 1988 "to preserve an important wetland area with its habitat, bird life and other wildlife," according to the conservation regulations. The inlet is a resting place for wetland birds, especially waders, and it is also an important overwintering place and has a strong nesting population. Six of the bird species that have been observed here are of international importance, 21 species are of national importance, and 35 are of regional importance. The landscape consists of varied seaside vegetation with wash margins and salt pans. Beach meadows and ponds lie inland from the beach. A pebble beach is also of geological interest.

Makkevika has a bird-ringing station and is one of the best-described bird locations in Norway. The area largely borders cultivated land, and it is surrounded by a buffer area measuring  that received protection at the same time.

The wildlife sanctuary is one of six natural areas that were included in the Giske Wetlands System Ramsar site, which was established in 1996.

References

External links
 Mijlø-direktoratet: Giske. Map and description of the nature reserve.
 Miljøverndepartementet. 1987. Giske fuglefredningsområde, Giske kommune, Møre og Romsdal fylke. 1:5,000 map of the wildlife sanctuary.
 Miljøverndepartementet. 1987. Giske fuglefredningsområde med tilgrensande dyrelivsfreding, Giske kommune, Møre og Romsdal fylke. 1:20,000 map of the wildlife sanctuary.
 Forskrift om vern av Giske fuglefredingsområde med tilgrensande dyrelivsfreding, Giske kommune, Møre og Romsdal. 1988.

Nature reserves in Norway
Ramsar sites in Norway
Protected areas of Møre og Romsdal
Giske
Protected areas established in 1988